Francesco Ingargiola (born 15 February 1973 in Mazara del Vallo) is an Italian long-distance runner, who finished 5th in the men's marathon at the 2006 European Athletics Championships in Gothenburg.

Biography
He won two gold medals at the World Military Track & Field Championship (1995 and 2003).

Achievements

National titles
Francesco Ingargiola has won one time the individual national championship.
1 win in Marathon (1997)

See also
 Italian all-time lists - half marathon
 Italian all-time lists - Marathon

References

External links
 

1973 births
Living people
People from Mazara del Vallo
Italian male long-distance runners
Italian male marathon runners
World Athletics Championships athletes for Italy
Sportspeople from the Province of Trapani
20th-century Italian people
21st-century Italian people